Elizabeth of England (1533–1603) was Queen of England from 1558 until her death.

Elizabeth of England may also refer to:

 Elizabeth II (1926–2022), Queen of the United Kingdom from 1952 until her death
 Elizabeth of Rhuddlan (1282–1316), daughter of King Edward I
 Elizabeth Woodville (1437–1492), queen consort, queen dowager and queen mother of England
 Elizabeth of York (1466–1503), queen consort of England from 1486 until her death
 Elizabeth Tudor (1492–1495), second daughter and fourth child of Henry VII of England and Elizabeth of York
 Elizabeth Stuart (daughter of Charles I) (1635–1650)
 Elizabeth Bowes-Lyon (1900–2002), queen consort of the United Kingdom and the British Dominions

See also
 Elizabeth of Great Britain (disambiguation)
 Elizabeth of the United Kingdom (disambiguation)
 Elizabeth the Queen Mother (disambiguation)
 Elizabeth Tudor (disambiguation)
 Princess Elizabeth (disambiguation)
 Queen Elizabeth (disambiguation)